Mario Marcelo Claros Enriquez (born 12 July 1964) is a Bolivian football manager and former player who played as a midfielder.

Career
After notably playing for the American side Washington Diplomats, Claros subsequently became a manager. He began his career in 2002 with Independiente Cochabamba, leaving in 2005, and joined Jorge Wilstermann in 2007 as a manager of the youth categories.

Claros was an interim manager of Wilstermann on two occasions, in 2007 and 2008.

In 2013, Claros joined Aurora as a youth manager, before being named in charge of the first team in 2015. He was dismissed in the following year.

Claros subsequently managed , Cochabamba FC and Universitario de Vinto, helping the latter side in their first-ever promotion to the Primera División in 2021. On 19 December of that year, he was maintained in charge of the side for the 2022 season.

Claros left La U on 26 May 2022, as the club opted not to extend his contract.

References

External links

1964 births
Living people
People from Cochabamba
Bolivian footballers
Association football midfielders
Washington Diplomats (1988–1990) players
Bolivian football managers
Bolivian Primera División managers
C.D. Jorge Wilstermann managers
Club Aurora managers
F.C. Universitario de Vinto managers